"Do U Wanna Roll (Dolittle Theme)" is a song by American recording artists R.L., Snoop Dogg and Lil' Kim. It was released in 2001 as the single for the soundtrack to the 2001 film Dr. Dolittle 2 with the record label J Records. The song also makes an appearance on RL debut studio album RL: Ements. The song contains interpolations from the song "Doo Wa Ditty (Blow That Thing)" (1982) by funk band Zapp from their second studio album Zapp II.

Track listing 
CD single
Do U Wanna Roll (Dolittle Theme) (Radio Edit Without Intro) (R.L., Snoop Dogg and Lil' Kim) — 4:02
Do U Wanna Roll (Dolittle Theme) (Radio Edit With Intro) (R.L., Snoop Dogg and Lil' Kim) — 4:02
Do U Wanna Roll (Dolittle Theme) (Instrumental) — 4:43
Do U Wanna Roll (Dolittle Theme) (Call Out Hook) (R.L., Snoop Dogg and Lil' Kim) — 0:10

Chart performance

Weekly charts

References

2001 singles
Snoop Dogg songs
Lil' Kim songs
Songs written by Snoop Dogg
2001 songs
J Records singles
Songs written by Lil' Kim